Ševkija Resić (born 4 December 1999) is a Bosnian professional footballer who plays as a midfielder. He most recently played for Bosnian Premier League club Željezničar.

Honours
Sarajevo
Bosnian Premier League: 2018–19
Bosnian Cup: 2018–19

References

External links

1999 births
Living people
Sportspeople from Tuzla
Association football midfielders
Bosnia and Herzegovina footballers
Bosnia and Herzegovina youth international footballers
Bosnia and Herzegovina under-21 international footballers
FK Sarajevo players
NK Čelik Zenica players
FK Novi Pazar players
FK Sloboda Tuzla players
NK Vis Simm-Bau players
FK Željezničar Sarajevo players
Premier League of Bosnia and Herzegovina players
Serbian SuperLiga players
First League of the Federation of Bosnia and Herzegovina players
Bosnia and Herzegovina expatriate footballers
Expatriate footballers in Serbia
Bosnia and Herzegovina expatriate sportspeople in Serbia